The expression 4Pi may refer to:
 IBM System/4 Pi, a family of avionics computers
 4Pi microscope, a microscope that uses interference and fluorescence computers
 4×π = 12.56637..., the solid angle of a complete sphere measured in steradians
 4Pi Reprap controller
 Hermetic detector (also called a 4π detector)